Citrobacter amalonaticus is a Gram-negative species of bacteria, a known human pathogen: it can cause neonatal meningitis and potentially gastroenteritis. It has been known to infect the urinary tract.

References

External links
Type strain of Citrobacter amalonaticus at BacDive -  the Bacterial Diversity Metadatabase

amalonaticus
Bacteria described in 1971